Irfan Habib (born August 10, 1931) is an Indian historian of ancient and medieval India, following the methodology of Marxist historiography in his contributions to economic history. He identifies as a Marxist and is well known for his strong stance against Hindutva and Islamic fundamentalism. He has authored a number of books, notably the Agrarian System of Mughal India, 1556–1707, an Atlas of the Mughal Empire: Political and Economic Maps With Detailed Notes, and an Atlas of Ancient Indian History (with Faiz Habib). As the general editor, he is also the driving force behind the A People's History of India series, volumes of which continue to be released.

Early and personal life

Habib was born in an Indian Muslim family, the son of Mohammad Habib, a Marxist historian and ideologue belonging to the Communist Party of India (Marxist), by his wife Sohaila Habib (née Tyabji). His paternal grandfather was Mohammad Naseem, a wealthy barrister and member of the Congress party, and his maternal grandfather was Abbas Tyabji, sometime Chief Justice of the High Court of Baroda princely state, and noted follower of Mahatma Gandhi.

Habib's wife Sayera Habib (née Siddiqui) was Professor of Economics at Aligarh Muslim University (AMU). The couple have three sons and a daughter.

Academic
After returning from Oxford, Habib joined AMU as a member of the faculty; he was Professor of History at Aligarh from 1969–91 and is presently a Professor Emeritus. He delivered the Radhakrishnan Lecture at Oxford in 1991. Habib is an Elected Corresponding Fellow of the British Royal Historical Society since 1997.

Habib has worked on the historical geography of Ancient India, the history of Indian technology, medieval administrative and economic history, colonialism and its impact on Indian historiography.

Amiya Kumar Bagchi describes Habib as "one of the two most prominent Marxist historians of India today and at the same time, one of the greatest living Marxist historians of India between the twelfth and eighteenth centuries."

Positions
He was Coordinator/Chairman of the Centre for Advanced Studies, AMU from 1975–77 and 1984–94. He was Chairman of the Indian Council of Historical Research during 1986–90. He was the general secretary, Sectional President, and then the General President of the Indian History Congress (1981).

Philosophical and political views
Habib identifies as a Marxist and uses Marxist historiography in his work.

Habib has also written books about Vedas and Vedic age, and he considers the Vedas to be a good historical source, which describes transmission in a priestly culture, that valued faithfulness. He further lays out the reasons that the texts were orally transmitted for hundreds of years, then they were finally written down.

Habib has a sustained commitment to secularism. He led the historians at the Indian History Congress of 1998 who moved a resolution against the "saffronisation" of history. He has said that the BJP government at the Centre which was in power from 1998–2004, especially the MHRD Minister himself, were responsible for inventing facts and dates to suit their interpretation of Indian history. To counter Irfan Habib, Murli Manohar Joshi released a book which rebuts the history of what the former minister calls '‘Habib & Co'’.

Honours
Among the first six Jawaharlal Nehru Fellowships, 1968.
Watumull Prize of American Historical Association, 1982. (Jointly with Tapan Raychaudhuri).
Padma Bhushan, Government of India, 2005.
Ibn Sina Memorial Lecture, 2009.
Honorary doctorate (D.Litt) by University of Calicut, 2010.
Yash Bharti, 2016
Honorary Fellow, New College, Oxford, 2021.

Selected publications
Books authored
The Agrarian System of Mughal India 1556–1707. First published in 1963 by Asia Publishing House. Second, extensively revised, edition published in 1999 by Oxford University Press.
An Atlas of the Mughal Empire: Political and Economic Maps With Detailed Notes, Bibliography, and Index. Oxford University Press, 1982
Essays in Indian History – Towards a Marxist Perception. Tulika Books, 1995.
The Economic History of Medieval India: A Survey. Tulika Books, 2001.
Medieval India: The Study of a Civilization. National Book Trust, 2008.
People's History of India – Part 1: Prehistory. Aligarh Historians Society and Tulika Books, 2001.
People's History of India Part 2 : The Indus Civilization. Aligarh Historians Society and Tulika Books, 2002.
A People's History of India Vol. 3 : The Vedic Age. (Co-author Vijay Kumar Thakur) Aligarh Historians Society and Tulika Books, 2003.
A People's History of India – Vol 4/5 : Mauryan India. (Co-author Vivekanand Jha) Aligarh Historians Society and Tulika Books, 2004.
A People's History of India – Vol 6 : Post-Mauryan India, 200 BC – AD 300. Tulika Books, 2013.
A People's History of India – Vol 14 : Economic History of India, AD 1206–1526, The Period of the Delhi Sultanate and the Vijayanagara Empire. Tulika Books, 2017.
A People's History of India – Vol 20 : Technology in Medieval India, c. 650–1750. Aligarh Historians Society and Tulika Books, 2016.
A People's History of India – Vol 25 : Indian Economy Under Early British Rule, 1757–1857. Tulika Books, 2014.
A People's History of India – Vol 28 : Indian Economy, 1858–1914. Aligarh Historians Society and Tulika Books, 2006.
A People's History of India – Vol 30 : The National Movement: Origins and Early Phase to 1918. Tulika Books, 2018.
A People's History of India – Vol 31 : The National Movement, Part 2: The Struggle for Freedom, 1919–1947. Tulika Books, 2020.
A People's History of India – Vol 36 : Man and Environment. Tulika Books, 2015.
The National Movement: Studies in Ideology & History. Tulika Books, 2011.
An Atlas of Ancient Indian History. (with Faiz Habib) Oxford University Press, 2012.

Books edited
The Cambridge Economic History of India – Volume I: 1200–1750 (co-editor Tapan Raychaudhuri)
UNESCO History of Civilizations of Central Asia, Vol 5 : Development in contrast: from the sixteenth to the mid-nineteenth century. (Co-editors Chahryar Adle and K M Baikapov)
UNESCO History of Humanity, Vol 4: From the seventh to the sixteenth century. (With various co-editors).
UNESCO History of Humanity, Vol 5: From the sixteenth to the eighteenth century. (With various co-editors).
The Growth of Civilizations in India And Iran
Sikh History from Persian Sources: Translations of Major Texts. (with J.S. Grewal) Indian History Congress and Tulika Books, 2011.
Akbar and His India
India – Studies in the History of an Idea. 
State & Diplomacy under Tipu Sultan
Confronting Colonialism
Medieval India – 1
A World to Win – Essays on the Communist Manifesto (co-editors Aijaz Ahmed and Prakash Karat)

References

External links

 Note Towards a Marxist Perception of Indian History, The Marxist, Oct–Dec 2010. 
 "Delhi Historians Group's Publication "Communalization of Education: The History Textbooks Controversy", A report in 2002, New Delhi: Jawaharlal Nehru University, India
Selected publications of Irfan Habib
The Nation That Is India – an article by Irfan Habib, the little magazine, 2003.

2001 Interview of Irfan Habib on Rediff
Historian: Prof Irfan Habib outlookindia.com. Magazine | 23 April 2007.

1931 births
Aligarh Muslim University alumni
Alumni of New College, Oxford
Academic staff of Aligarh Muslim University
Emeritus Professors in India
Fellows of the Royal Historical Society
Historians of South Asia
Living people
Recipients of the Padma Bhushan in literature & education
Indian atheists
Gujarati people
Indian Marxist historians
Analysts of Ayodhya dispute
Jawaharlal Nehru Fellows
20th-century Indian historians
Indian political writers
Indian male writers
20th-century Indian educational theorists
Tyabji family